Dancing on the Edge is a 1986 album by American guitarist and blues musician Roy Buchanan. This was his second record for Alligator Records. It was recorded and mixed by Justin Niebank, mastered by Tom Coyne and produced by Roy Buchanan, Dick Shurman and Bruce Iglauer. Delbert McClinton sang lead vocals on some songs.

Track listing
All tracks composed by Roy Buchanan; except where indicated
 "Peter Gunn" (Henry Mancini)
 "The Chokin' Kind" (Harlan Howard)
 "Jungle Gym" - instrumental 
 "Drowning on Dry Land" (Mickey Gregory, Alan Jones)
 "Petal to the Metal" - instrumental
 "You Can't Judge a Book by the Cover" (Willie Dixon)
 "Cream of the Crop" - instrumental
 "Beer Drinking Woman" (Peter Chatman)
 "Whiplash" - instrumental
 "Baby, Baby, Baby" (Aretha Franklin, Carolyn Franklin)
 "Matthew" - instrumental

Personnel
Roy Buchanan – guitar and vocals
Larry Exum – bass guitar  
Morris Jennings – drums 
Stan Szelest – keyboards
Donald Kinsey – guitar 
Delbert McClinton – vocals on "The Chokin' Kind", "You Can't Judge a Book by its Cover" and "Baby, Baby, Baby"

References

1986 albums
Roy Buchanan albums
Albums produced by Bruce Iglauer
Alligator Records albums